is a noted Japanese author and professor of creative writing at Tokai University's Shonan campus.

Biography
A native of Nobeoka, Miyazaki, Ii graduated in 1978 from Keio University with a degree in history (archaeology and ethnology). His first novel, Kusa no kanmuri (The Grass Radical), was published in 1983, and received the Gunzo Prize for New Writers. Subsequent prizes include:

 1989 Noma Literary Prize for New Writers, for Sashite juyo denai ichinichi (A Day of Little Importance)
 1994 Hirabayashi Taiko Prize, for Shinka no tokei (Evolution Clock)
 2000 Yomiuri Literary Prize, for Nigotta gekiryu ni kakaru hashi (Bridge Over a Muddy Torrent)

English translations 
 My visit to the Yubijima Isles, translated by M. Jacob and edited by Harry Aveling, Bundoora, Vic. : La Trobe University, School of Asian Studies, 1996. 18 pages.
 Aoneko kazoku tentenroku (The Shadow of a Blue Cat), translated by Wayne P. Lammers. Champaign, IL and London: Dalkey Archive Press, 2011.

References

External links 
 Naoyuki Ii at J'Lit Books from Japan 
 Synopsis of The Shadow of a Blue Cat (Aoneko kazoku tentenroku) at JLPP (Japanese Literature Publishing Project) 
 Tokai University: Naoyuki Ii
 Japanese Literature Publishing Project English Program

Japanese writers
Living people
Yomiuri Prize winners
Year of birth missing (living people)
Writers from Miyazaki Prefecture